The 1896 Wisconsin gubernatorial election was held on November 3, 1896.

Incumbent Republican Governor William H. Upham retired.

Republican nominee Edward Scofield defeated Democratic nominee Willis C. Silverthorn with 59.67% of the vote.

General election

Candidates
Major party candidates
Willis C. Silverthorn, Democratic, Democratic nominee for Wisconsin's 8th congressional district in 1880, Democratic nominee for Attorney General of Wisconsin in 1884
Edward Scofield, Republican, former State Senator

Other candidates
Joshua H. Berkey, Prohibition, temperance lecturer
Christ Tuttrop, Socialist Labor
Robert Henderson, National, Prohibitionist nominee for Wisconsin State Senate in 1892

Results

References

Bibliography
 
 
 

1896
Wisconsin
Gubernatorial